Sulfidogermanates or thiogermanates are chemical compounds containing anions with sulfur atoms bound to germanium. They are in the class of chalcogenidotetrelates. Related compounds include thiosilicates, thiostannates, selenidogermanates, telluridogermanates and selenidostannates.

Coordination of sulfur around germanium is tetrahedral meaning there are four sulfur atoms symmetrically arranged. This basic structure can form ortho salts with GeS44−, oligomers, or polymeric structures. Similar structures are also formed with heavy group 13 and group 14 elements due to their relatively stronger bonds with sulfur. Light elements from these groups have lower affinity for sulfur, so there are fewer compounds like this for boron, aluminium, carbon, and silicon. Other heavy group 12 and 15 elements also form chalcogenidometallates which may have other kinds of coordination. Selenium forms similar compounds to sulfur in this family.

Where sulfur is deficient, an anion is not formed, and instead cation-like covalent compounds can exist with halogens, such as Ge4S6Br4, or Ge4S6I4.

Production
The solvochemical method of production involves dissolving germanium oxide, sulfur and other salts in a heated solvent under pressure. The solvents can include simple alcohols, amines or N,N-dimethyl formamide. The containers can be glass tubes, quartz tubes, or teflon lined stainless steel.

List

References

Germanium(IV) compounds
Sulfides